The 1972 Virginia Slims of Jacksonville  was a women's tennis tournament played on indoor clay courts at the Deerwood Club in Jacksonville, Florida in the United States that was part of the 1972 Women's Tennis Circuit. It was the inaugural edition of the tournament and was held from April 4 through April 9, 1972. Unseeded Marie Neumannová won the singles title and earned $3,400 first-prize money.

Finals

Singles
 Marie Neumannová defeated  Billie Jean King 6–4, 6–3

Doubles
 Judy Dalton /  Karen Krantzcke defeated  Vicki Berner /  Billie Jean King 7–5, 6–4

Prize money

References

Virginia Slims of Jacksonville
Virginia Slims of Jacksonville
Virginia Slims of Jacksonville
Virginia Slims of Jacksonville